Dargan Bridge may refer to:

Dargan Bridge, Belfast, a railway bridge
William Dargan Bridge, Dublin, a light rail bridge